"Die Laughing" is a song by rock band Therapy? released as a single on A&M Records on 30 May 1994. It is featured on the Troublegum album. The single reached number 29 in the UK Singles Chart, and number 14 in the Irish Singles Chart.

The single was released on CD, CD digipak, 12" vinyl, red 7" vinyl and cassette.

Therapy? performed this song live at the 1994 MTV Europe Music Awards in Berlin, And was supposed to be played at the 1994 Mercury Music Prize Awards in London.

Track listing 

Live tracks recorded at the Town & Country Club, Leeds, England on 27 February 1994

Personnel
Andy Cairns: vocals/guitar
Fyfe Ewing: drums
Michael McKeegan: bass
Chris Sheldon: producer (Die Laughing & Evil Elvis)
Chris Leckie: engineer (live tracks)
David Holmes: additional production and remix
Nigel Rolfe: photography
Stuart Smyth: photography
Jeremy Pearce: design
Simon Carrington: design

References

1994 singles
Therapy? songs
1994 songs
Song recordings produced by Chris Sheldon
A&M Records singles
Songs written by Andy Cairns
Songs written by Fyfe Ewing
Songs written by Michael McKeegan
British alternative rock songs